Petrus Mosellanus Protegensis (real name Peter Schade) (b. 1493 in Bruttig, d. 19 April 1524 in Leipzig) was a German humanist scholar. He is best known for the popular work on rhetoric, Tabulae de schematibus et tropis, and his Paedologia. He became professor at the University of Leipzig.
He gave the opening Latin oration at the 1519 Leipzig Disputation between Johann Eck and Martin Luther.

References
Robert Francis Seybolt (1927), Renaissance Student Life. The Paedologia of Petrus Mosellanus, Translated from the Latin

Notes

External links
Life and works of Petrus Mosellanus

Online scans :
Isocratis Oratio de bello fugiendo et pace servanda ad populum Atheniensem, Petro Mosellano interprete
Paedologia
Tabulae in Erasmi Roter., libellum de duplici copia
Tabulae de schematibus
Tabulae in rhetorica de Philippi Melanchthonis

1493 births
1524 deaths
16th-century German people
16th-century Latin-language writers
German Renaissance humanists
German classical scholars
Academic staff of Leipzig University
People from Cochem-Zell